Journalese is the artificial or hyperbolic, and sometimes over-abbreviated, language regarded as characteristic of the news style used in popular media. Joe Grimm, formerly of the Detroit Free Press, likened journalese to a "stage voice": "We write journalese out of habit, sometimes from misguided training, and to sound urgent, authoritative and, well, journalistic. But it doesn't do any of that."

Examples
As early as the 1880s, people criticized the stilted, cliched language used in journalism as journalese. Journalists, who write many similar stories under time pressure, may fall back on cliched or familiar phrases.  Journalese often takes the form of specific turns of phrase, such as "hammered out agreement" or "called for tighter restrictions". Terms with legal meanings, such as "mayhem", may be overused to the point that they become meaningless. Journalese can also take the form of specific word choice. This is most obvious with the use of rare or archaic words like ink (as a verb), nab, slated, ailing, quizzed (in place of "asked" or "questioned"), funnyman or synonyms of attack to mean criticise. In some cases this is due to fossil words present in idiomatic journalese statements. Journalese is also often a result of a desire to save on page space by using shorter words or phrases. This need for brevity is particularly important in headlines, which have their own idiosyncratic style of writing called headlinese. Headlinese's focus on using the smallest possible words has influenced the vocabulary choice of news stories themselves. Anthropomorphization is another form of journalese, such as with the use of the verb saw (past tense of see) in the phrase "The 1990s saw an increase in crime", which is used to avoid using the past tense of "increase", as in "Crime increased in the 1990s". Other forms include use of onomatopoeia, genitives of place names ("New York's Central Park" rather than "Central Park, in New York"), and gap filler articles like bus plunges.

Some people regard journalese with amusement, due to the often colourful use of language, and some terms used can make news reports more easily understandable, such as replacing complex jargon with simple and concise phrases. However, one critic says that "lazy writing goes with lazy thought", and it is often a mark of a weak story with poor evidence or an attempt to dress up something as more significant or interesting: "Journalese is like a poker player's tell: it shows that the reporter knows the story is flimsy and he or she is trying to make it appear more solid." Other critics fault the use of the passive voice and similar constructions in journalese as a form of weasel wording that a writer chooses "to hide the culprit" of the action that the writer is describing. Subeditors (copy editors) on newspapers are trained to remove it, and the New York Times  has a customised spell-checker that flags egregious examples.

See also 
 Academese
 Legalese
 Varietyese

References

Further reading

Fritz Spiegl: Keep Taking the Tabloids. What the Papers Say and How They Say It (1983)

External links
 John Leo: "Do you speak journalese?" 

Newswriting
Jargon
Copy editing